Manfred Geyer (born 23 May 1951, in Altenfeld) is a former German biathlete. During his career he won a bronze medal in the 1976 Winter Olympics in the 4 x 7.5 km relay and two more bronze medals in the 1973 and 1977 Biathlon World Championships.

References

1951 births
German male biathletes
Olympic biathletes of East Germany
Olympic bronze medalists for East Germany
Biathletes at the 1976 Winter Olympics
Living people
Olympic medalists in biathlon
Biathlon World Championships medalists
Medalists at the 1976 Winter Olympics